Bonani is an Assamese language drama film directed by Jahnu Barua. The film stars Sushil Goswami, Bishnu Kharghoria and Monami Bezbaruah. The film was released in 1989. The film is set with an ecological angle and won National Film Award for Best film on environment.

Plot summary
The film centres on a forest ranger who confronts illegal timber merchants and contractors on behalf of the impoverished tribal people. His actions result his frequent transfers that annoys his wife who wants to settle down and look after their ailing children. Eventually she stands by her husband in his fight and the tribal people also realise that they need a weapon to defend themselves.

Casts 
Mridula Baruah
Sushil Goswami
Bishnu Kharghoria
Golap Dutta
Lakshmi Sinha
Munin Sharma
Jyoti Bhattacharya
Shasanka Sebo Phukan

Awards
National Films Award – Best film on Environment

See also
Jollywood Assamese

References

External links
 
Dolphin Films

1990 films
Films set in Assam
Best Film on Environment Conservation/Preservation National Film Award winners
Films directed by Jahnu Barua
1990s Assamese-language films